CCPS is an abbreviation that may refer to :

One of several school districts in the United States:
District School Board of Collier County, a school district in Southwest Florida
Charlotte County Public Schools, a school district in Southwest Florida
Chesterfield County Public Schools, a school division in Virginia
Camden City Public Schools, a school district in New Jersey
Cobb County Public Schools, a school district in Georgia
Carroll County Public Schools (Maryland), a school district in Maryland
Cecil County Public Schools, a school district in Maryland
Charles County Public Schools, a school district in Maryland
Clayton County Public Schools, a school district in Georgia
Culpeper County Public Schools
Center for Chemical Process Safety, an initiative of the American Institute of Chemical Engineers
Center for Congressional and Presidential Studies, a teaching and study program
Consumer Council for Postal Services, the official monitoring body for the British Royal Mail
Catalytically competent protonation state, the catalytically active protonation state of an enzyme

See also

CCP (disambiguation)